Ashfield Shale is part of the Wianamatta group of sedimentary rocks in the Sydney Basin. It lies directly on contemporaneously eroded Hawkesbury sandstone or the Mittagong formation. These rock types were formed in the Triassic Period. It is named after the Sydney suburb of Ashfield. Some of the early research was performed at the old Ashfield Brickworks Quarry. This rock type is often associated with the Inner West and North Shore of the city. However, it has also been recorded at Penrith, Revesby, Bilpin and Mount Irvine.

Description 

Ashfield Shale comprises black mudstones and grey shales with frequent sideritic clay ironstone bands. The thickness ranges between 45 and 64 metres.    It is 20 metres thick at the Sydney Olympic Site. The chemistry of the rock is typical of shales, with high iron levels, and some iron sulphide and low calcium levels. The geology of the shale lenses within the Hawkesbury Sandstone is chemically similar to the Ashfield Shale. At Turramurra 33 metres remains and formerly there was a good deep exposure of it at the Railway Station until this suffered shotcreting.

Small scale bedding is abundant. The shales are sandy at the top of the sequence. There are up to ten bands in a fifteen-metre section. The fine grained silty sediments were laid down in a low energy, south-east flowing deltaic setting, near the shores of a shallow sea. Ashfield Shale underlies the Prospect dolerite intrusion in Pemulwuy.

Natural selection in which the Ashfield Shale is completely exposed is rare. However, it can be seen at railway and roadside cuttings, as well as old quarries. With weathering and exposure, the shale becomes a paler colour.

Weathering of the shale units produces a reddish/brown podsolic soil, often with poor drainage, such as that in the Cumberland Plain. These clay soils are recognised as being reactive with an appreciable shrink-swell capacity.

Engineering and construction 

The adjacent Hawkesbury Sandstone is considered a safer bedrock than the (less stable and laminated) Ashfield Shale for building construction. In 2005, the construction of the Lane Cove Tunnel was affected by the collapse of an exit ramp excavation, through Ashfield Shale. Difficulties may be encountered where the Ashfield Shale interfaces with the Hawkesbury Sandstone and the Mittagong Formation.

Flora 

Ashfield Shale is associated with the critically endangered Blue Gum High Forest and Sydney Turpentine-Ironbark Forest.

Industry and agriculture 
In the earlier days of Sydney, the Ashfield Shale supported a number of quarries. The shale provided a suitable raw material for brickmaking. Sydney soils based on shale are not particularly fertile. But at Parramatta they proved more suitable to agriculture than those at Farm Cove, in the early days of the First Fleet.

Fossils 
Ashfield Shale is considered a freshwater lacustrine paleoenvironment. It was gradually inundated by brackish water, then shallow marine waters over a long period of time.

Fossils are not common in this stratum, however, fossil bivalves, plants, isopods, insects and amphibians have been recorded. One outstanding example being of a Paracyclotosaurus at St Peters, 2.25 metres long. It is one of the most complete mastodonsaurid skeletons ever recovered. Notobrachyops is a genus of brachyopid temnospondyl amphibian. It is known from a skull roof impression found in the Ashfield Shale at the old Hurstville Brick Company quarry at Mortdale.

The Ashfield Shale has also yielded a shark species, a lungfish species, six species of paleoniscid fish, a species of holostean fish, and a subholostean fish.

Fossil fauna

References 

Geologic formations of Australia
Triassic Australia
Shale formations
Fossiliferous stratigraphic units of Oceania
Paleontology in New South Wales
Geology of New South Wales